"Flight 1" is the second episode of the second season of the American television drama series Mad Men. It was written by series creator Matthew Weiner and Lisa Albert, and was directed by Andrew Bernstein. The episode originally aired on AMC in the United States on August 3, 2008.

Plot
The episode opens on February 28, 1962, with a party hosted by Paul Kinsey in his apartment in New Jersey. Other Sterling Cooper employees and their significant others are in attendance, though many are uncomfortable with the Beatnik and multiracial locale. Paul introduces Joan to his new girlfriend, Sheila, who is Black. When the women are alone, Joan makes condescending comments to Sheila and muses, "The last thing I would have taken Paul for was open-minded." During the party, Peggy makes out with a gentleman she just met, but later rejects him and goes home alone.

The following morning, Don Draper and Roger Sterling come into the office to see all their employees huddled around a radio broadcasting news of the crash of an American Airlines plane in Jamaica Bay. Don orders everyone back to work and requests they pull all advertisements for the agency's client, Mohawk Airlines, to prevent a Mohawk ad next to a picture of the plane crash in the newspaper. Several of the employees make insensitive jokes about the crash.

Pete receives a call from his brother, Bud, with news that their father was on the plane that went down. In shock, Pete awkwardly approaches Don for advice. Don advises Pete to go home and says "there's life and there's work". Later, Pete meets with his family to discuss their father's death; it is a stiff and stilted gathering. Bud tells Pete their father was broke upon his death after spending most of his money on "oysters, travel and club memberships." The sons do not tell this to their mother.

The Drapers have their neighbors Carlton and Francine over to play cards. During the game, Betty mentions how their son, Bobby, traced a drawing at school, but pretended he drew it himself. Don defends him, pointing out that his whole art department traces, but Betty dislikes Bobby's dishonesty. When Carlton and Francine leave, Betty and Don end up in an argument over Carlton's previous affair. Don believes Carlton is unhappy, but Betty states that he should be grateful to still be with Francine.

Peggy visits her mother and sister in Brooklyn for dinner. Her mother tries to convince her to attend Mass on Sundays with them, but Peggy refuses. Peggy's sister alludes to Peggy being considered unfit psychiatrically by the State of New York. When Peggy leaves, she reluctantly looks into the children's bedroom where it is implied that her heretofore undiscussed baby sleeps.

Roger, Duck and Cooper have a meeting about the possibility of American Airlines hiring Sterling Cooper as their new ad agency to rebuild their image in the public eye. When told of the situation, Draper dislikes the idea because taking American Airlines as a client would mean dumping Mohawk Airlines due to a conflict of interest. Don thinks they should stay loyal to Mohawk.

Joan and Paul have a barbed exchange over her comments to Sheila at the party. Joan accuses him of being phony about his lifestyle and only dating Sheila to seem "interesting." Paul secretly makes a copy of Joan's driver's license and posts it on the office bulletin board, revealing to everyone that Joan is 31. Joan expresses her exasperation that people cannot leave their personal lives outside the office.

Duck goes to Pete and offers his condolences. He tries to convince Pete to help him get American Airlines to do business with them. Pete is confused about the situation and attempts to go to Don for advice. Frustrated over having to drop Mohawk, Don snaps at Pete and turns him away. During Duck's meeting with the American Airlines executive, Pete unexpectedly shows up. He reveals his father's death to the executive, and uses it to subtly guilt him into considering Sterling Cooper.

In the evening, Don meets with the Mohawk Airlines CEO and tells him Sterling Cooper is letting them go. The CEO expresses disappointment in Don specifically for misrepresenting the company's intentions in their first meeting. A waitress at the restaurant flirts with Don, but, after considering her for a moment, Don turns her down.

The episode ends with Peggy in church with her mother and sister. When their row is called up for Communion, Peggy remains seated.  Her sister hands Peggy her baby, who begins crying as soon as Peggy holds him.

Reception
"Flight 1" was watched by 1.3 million viewers.

"Flight 1" was positively reviewed by critics. Eric Goldman of IGN said, "This was a great episode of Mad Men, as some deeply personal issues mixed with the ad game in the worst possible way for the ever-fascinating character of Pete." This episode received a review of "Amazing", and 9/10 stars because the writers included many historical events that lead to strong story lines.

Production
Series creator Matthew Weiner says "Flight 1" is about how the characters deal with change. "The second episode to me is about...how you should react to anything and what you were told you should do..." Pete Campbell has to deal with the loss of his father, and goes to Don asking how he should react. Weiner had Pete's father die in the American Airlines crash because Christopher Allport, the actor who played Pete's father, had died in an avalanche. They thought since Pete and his father did not have a good relationship, that it was better to have him die rather than recast the part and keep that storyline going. Peggy Olson is still dealing with the birth of her child. Weiner still wanted to portray Peggy as a young girl. Although she had a child that does not stop her from going out and having a good time.  Peggy seems to have done what was recommended to her by not keeping her baby: rather, she has let someone else raise it. This episode showed many characters do as they "should" and follow the advice of others.

References

External links
 "Flight 1" at AMC

2008 American television episodes
Mad Men (season 2) episodes